The Durant was a make of automobile assembled by Durant Motors Corporation of New York City, New York from 1921 to 1926 and again from 1928 to 1932.  Durant Motors was founded by William "Billy" Durant after he was terminated, for the second and final time, as the head of General Motors.  Billy Durant's intent was to build an automotive empire that could one day challenge General Motors.

The Durant automobile is considered to be an example of an "assembled" automobile because so many of its components were obtained from outside suppliers. From 1921 to 1926 the vehicle was powered by a four cylinder or 6 cyl overhead valve Continental engine. The vehicle was directed at the Oakland automobile price point.

Production of the vehicle was suspended for 1927. When the Durant was reintroduced April 1928, the car was redesigned and powered by a six cylinder Continental engine; some of the early vehicles were marketed as the "Durant-Star".  Bodies for the vehicle were supplied by Budd Company. In 1930, some Durants were built with all steel bodies, also supplied by Budd.

Durant Motors was found insolvent and automobile production ended early in 1932.

Production model specifications
 Durant Touring Car

External links 
Durant Motors Automobile Club

 
Motor vehicle manufacturers based in New York (state)
Vintage vehicles
Defunct motor vehicle manufacturers of the United States
Defunct manufacturing companies based in New York City
1921 establishments in New York (state)
1932 disestablishments in New York (state)
Vehicle manufacturing companies established in 1921
Vehicle manufacturing companies disestablished in 1932
Budd Company

1920s cars
1930s cars